Troubled Waters is a 1964 British crime film directed by Stanley Goulder and starring Tab Hunter, Zena Walker and Andy Myers. It was also released as Man with Two Faces.

Premise
A violent criminal is released from prison and returns home to his wife and the young son he barely knows.

Cast
 Tab Hunter as Alex Carswell
 Zena Walker as Janet Carswell
 Andy Myers as Ronnie Carswell
 Michael Goodliffe as Jeff Driscoll
 Yvette Rees as Sally Driscoll
 Stanley Morgan as Reverend Wilcox
 Arnold Bell as Attendant
 Marianne Stone as Miss Stone

References

External links

Troubled Waters at BFI

1964 films
British crime drama films
Films directed by Stanley Goulder
1964 crime films
1960s English-language films
1960s British films